Yacolla may refer to

 Yacolla, a genus of spiders
 Yacolla (cloth), An outer garment in the Inca men's clothing that was similar to a cloak or mantle